Non-Langerhans cell histiocytosis refers to a family of histiocytosis characterized by the absence of Langerhans cells.

Many manifest cutaneously.

The spectrum of non-langerhans cell histiocytoses include:
 Benign cephalic histiocytosis
 Generalized eruptive histiocytoma
 Indeterminate cell histiocytosis
 Juvenile xanthogranuloma
 Progressive nodular histiocytoma
 Necrobiotic xanthogranuloma
 (Giant Cell) Reticulohistiocytoma
 Multicentric reticulohistiocytosis
 Rosai–Dorfman disease
 Xanthoma disseminatum
 Kikuchi disease
 Erdheim–Chester disease.

References

External links 

Monocyte- and macrophage-related cutaneous conditions
Histiocytosis